These are the full results of the 2004 South American Under-23 Championships in Athletics which took place between June 26 and June 27, 2004, at Polideportivo Máximo Viloria in Barquisimeto, Venezuela.

Men's results

100 meters

Heats – 26 June
Wind: Heat 1: +0.1 m/s, Heat 2: 0.0 m/s

Final – 26 June
Wind: +0.0 m/s

200 meters

Heats – 27 June
Wind: Heat 1: -0.6 m/s, Heat 2: -1.3 m/s

Final – 27 June
Wind: +0.0 m/s

400 meters

Heats – 26 June

Final – 26 June

800 meters
Final – 27 June

1500 meters
Final – 26 June

5000 meters
Final – 26 June

10,000 meters
Final – 27 June

3000 meters steeplechase
Final – 27 June

110 meters hurdles
Final – 27 June
Wind: -0.4 m/s

400 meters hurdles

Heats – 26 June

Final – 26 June

High jump
Final – 27 June

Pole vault
Final – 27 June

Long jump
Final – 26 June

Triple jump
Final – 26 June

Shot put
Final – 26 June

Discus throw
Final – 26 June

Hammer throw
Final – 26 June

Javelin throw
Final – 27 June

Decathlon
Final – 27 June

20,000 meters walk
Final – 27 June

4x100 meters relay

Guest Final – 27 June

Final – 27 June

4x400 meters relay
Final – 27 June

Women's results

100 meters

Heats – 26 June
Wind: Heat 1: 0.0 m/s, Heat 2: 0.0 m/s

Final – 26 June
Wind: +0.0 m/s

200 meters

Heats – 27 June
Wind: Heat 1: 0.0 m/s, Heat 2: 0.0 m/s

Final – 27 June
Wind: +0.0 m/s

400 meters

Heats – 26 June

Final – 27 June

800 meters
Final – 27 June

1500 meters
Final – 26 June

5000 meters
Final – 27 June

10,000 meters
Final – 26 June

3000 meters steeplechase
Final – 27 June

100 meters hurdles

Heats – 26 June
Wind: Heat 1: +0.0 m/s, Heat 2: -1.5 m/s

Final – 26 June
Wind: -0.9 m/s

400 meters hurdles
Final – 27 June

High jump
Final – 27 June

Pole vault
Final – 27 June

Long jump
Final – 27 June

Triple jump
Final – 26 June

Shot put
Final – 26 June

Discus throw
Final – 26 June

Hammer throw
Final – 27 June

Javelin throw
Final – 27 June

Heptathlon
Final – 27 June

20,000 meters walk
Final – 26 June

4x100 meters relay

Guest Final – 26 June

Final – 27 June

4x400 meters relay
Final – 27 June

Note
The names of the Brazilian athletes were completed using the published list of participants.

References

Events at the South American Under-23 Championships in Athletics
South American U23 Championships
2004 in youth sport